The Huangtu Grapes cup 2012 18th Asian Junior and Cadet Table Tennis Championships were held in Jiangyin, China, from  11 to 16 July 2012. It was organised by the Chinese Table Tennis Association under the authority of the Asian Table Tennis Union (ATTU).

Medal summary

Events

Medal table

See also

2012 World Junior Table Tennis Championships
Asian Table Tennis Championships
Asian Table Tennis Union

References

Asian Junior and Cadet Table Tennis Championships
Asian Junior and Cadet Table Tennis Championships
Asian Junior and Cadet Table Tennis Championships
Asian Junior and Cadet Table Tennis Championships
Table tennis competitions in China
International sports competitions hosted by China
Asian Junior and Cadet Table Tennis Championships